Noah Gordon (November 11, 1926November 22, 2021) was an American novelist.

Early life and career 
Gordon was born in Worcester, Massachusetts, on November 11, 1926, the son of a pawnbroker. He served in the US Army at the end of World War II. He reported for the Worcester Telegram until he was hired by the Boston Herald in 1959.

Works and reception 
Some of the topics covered within his novels include medical history and medical ethics. Later he began to focus more on themes relating to the Inquisition and Jewish cultural history.

Gordon's debut novel, The Rabbi, spent 26 weeks on The New York Times Best Seller list in 1965. When publishing The Physician, the book was picked up by Random House - Germany, which promoted the book in Europe, where Gordon became very popular in Spain and Italy. His novel The Last Jew won "Que Leer Prize" (Spain) and "Boccaccio Literary Prize" (Italy).

Though Gordon's reception internationally has been quite strong, as of 2015, the Boston Globe described Gordon as relatively unknown in the United States. New York Times writer Carey Goldberg described a similar tension between Gordon's widespread popularity in Germany and relative lack of awareness in the United States in 1996. The reasons for  the European success of his novel The Physician were discussed in the Forward.  

His novel Shaman won the first James Fenimore Cooper Prize for Best Historical Fiction in 1993.

Personal life 
Gordon had three children with his wife, Lorraine (née Seay). He died on November 22, 2021, in Dedham, Massachusetts, at the age of 95.

Novels 

 The Rabbi (1965)
 The Death Committee (1969)
 The Jerusalem Diamond (1979)
 The Last Jew (2000)
 Sam and Other Animal Stories (2002) (children's stories)
 The Winemaker (2007)

Cole family trilogy 
 The Physician (1986) (film adaption in 2013)
 Shaman (1992)
 Matters of Choice (1995)

References

External links 
 

1926 births
2021 deaths
20th-century American male writers
20th-century American novelists
21st-century American male writers
21st-century American novelists
American male novelists
Jewish American writers
James Fenimore Cooper Prize winners
Journalists from Massachusetts
Military personnel from Massachusetts
Writers from Worcester, Massachusetts
United States Army personnel of World War II